is a Japanese production company that develops works created by, and also serves as the literary estate of manga artist Shotaro Ishinomori, headquartered in Yoyogi, Tokyo. Such works include 009-1, Kikaider, Inazuman, Ganbare!! Robocon, Voicelugger, the Toei Fushigi Comedy Series, the Kamen Rider series and the early entries of the Super Sentai series. In Indonesia, it is also present in the original tokusatsu series Indonesia, namely BIMA Satria Garuda and Satria Garuda BIMA-X based on Kamen Rider series.

Works

Live-action

TV series

Films

TV specials and short films

Animes
Credited as Ishimori Entertainment.

External links
Ishimori Pro | Official Website 

Film production companies of Japan
Television production companies of Japan